Phalonidia cerina is a species of moth of the family Tortricidae first described by Józef Razowski and Vitor Osmar Becker in 2007. It is found in Espírito Santo, Brazil.

The wingspan is about 8 mm. The ground colour of the forewings is pale yellowish cream, in the basal and dorsal portions of the wing slightly mixed with ferruginous. There are brown dots along the termen. The hindwings are cream, somewhat mixed with brownish on the periphery.

Etymology
The species name refers to the colouration of the forewings and is derived from Latin cerina (meaning of wax colour).

References

Moths described in 2007
Phalonidia